The mandibular lymph node is a lymph node found near the jaw.

References 

Lymphatics of the head and neck